Stella is a town in Oneida County, Wisconsin, United States. The population was 633 at the 2000 census. The unincorporated community of Starks is located within the town.

History
The town was named for Stella, a character mentioned in works by Jonathan Swift.

Geography
According to the United States Census Bureau, the town has a total area of 37.3 square miles (96.6 km2), of which, 35.3 square miles (91.5 km2) of it is land and 2.0 square miles (5.1 km2) of it (5.26%) is water.

Demographics
As of the census of 2000, there were 633 people, 236 households, and 188 families residing in the town. The population density was 17.9 people per square mile (6.9/km2). There were 316 housing units at an average density of 8.9 per square mile (3.5/km2). The racial makeup of the town was 97.63% White, 0.47% Native American, 0.16% Asian, 0.16% from other races, and 1.58% from two or more races. Hispanic or Latino of any race were 0.32% of the population.

There were 236 households, out of which 30.9% had children under the age of 18 living with them, 67.4% were married couples living together, 7.6% had a female householder with no husband present, and 20.3% were non-families. 14.4% of all households were made up of individuals, and 5.5% had someone living alone who was 65 years of age or older. The average household size was 2.65 and the average family size was 2.90.

In the town, the population was spread out, with 25.6% under the age of 18, 6.2% from 18 to 24, 27.2% from 25 to 44, 28.6% from 45 to 64, and 12.5% who were 65 years of age or older. The median age was 39 years. For every 100 females, there were 99.1 males. For every 100 females age 18 and over, there were 94.6 males.

The median income for a household in the town was $40,909, and the median income for a family was $46,375. Males had a median income of $36,375 versus $20,694 for females. The per capita income for the town was $16,712. About 5.1% of families and 8.3% of the population were below the poverty line, including 7.9% of those under age 18 and 3.9% of those age 65 or over.

Transportation
The Rhinelander-Oneida County Airport (KRHI) serves Stella, the county and surrounding communities with both scheduled commercial jet service and general aviation services.

References

External links
Town of Stella, Wisconsin

Towns in Oneida County, Wisconsin
Towns in Wisconsin